Parmouti 11 - Coptic Calendar - Parmouti 13

The twelfth day of the Coptic month of Parmouti, the eighth month of the Coptic year. In common years, this day corresponds to April 7, of the Julian Calendar, and April 20, of the Gregorian Calendar. This day falls in the Coptic Season of Shemu, the season of the Harvest.

Commemorations

Heavenly Orders 

 Monthly commemoration of Archangel Michael

Saints 

 The departure of Saint Alexander the Confessor, Bishop of Jerusalem 
 The departure of Saint Antonius, Bishop of Thmoui

References 

Days of the Coptic calendar